The Astral was a car built from 1923 to 1924 by Hertford Engineering Co Ltd, Barking, then in Essex (now in east London), England. 

Only one model was made, the 12/40, and although it was short-lived, it had many advanced features. The engine, made in-house, was a 1720 cc four-cylinder with a single overhead camshaft, and the car had brakes on all four wheels. It cost £365 for a two-seater and £375 for a four/five-seat tourer. The number made is not known.

See also
 List of car manufacturers of the United Kingdom

References
Georgano, G.N., "Astral", in G.N. Georgano, ed., The Complete Encyclopedia of Motorcars 1885-1968  (New York: E.P. Dutton and Co., 1974), pp.56.

Defunct motor vehicle manufacturers of England
Companies based in the London Borough of Barking and Dagenham
Cars introduced in 1923